The canton of Carpentras-Nord is a French administrative division in the department of Vaucluse and region Provence-Alpes-Côte d'Azur. It had 31,444 inhabitants (2012). It was disbanded following the French canton reorganisation which came into effect in March 2015.

Composition
The communes in the canton of Carpentras-Nord:
Aubignan
Caromb
Carpentras (partly)
Loriol-du-Comtat
Saint-Hippolyte-le-Graveyron
Sarrians

References 

Carpentras-Nord
2015 disestablishments in France
States and territories disestablished in 2015